Mario Brown ( – October 5, 2002), known as "Bro' Rap", was the first African-American men's basketball player at Texas A&M University.

Early years
Mario Brown attended Parker High School in Chicago, Illinois.  As a senior, Brown was named the most valuable player of the school's basketball team and earned all-district honors.  He was also president of the school's student council and played on the baseball team.

After graduating from high school, Brown played basketball for two years for Kennedy-King Junior College in Chicago.

Texas A&M University
Brown was recruited by Texas A&M coach Shelby Metcalf, who travelled to Chicago, Illinois to personally ask Brown to attend the school.  Brown played for two seasons at A&M, starting in 51 games and averaging 14 points and 4.3 assists per game.  In his first season, 1971–1972, Brown earned second team All-Southwest Conference honors, leading A&M with a 16.9 scoring average in conference play and helping the team to a 16–10 record.  The following year, his senior year, Brown was selected as team co-captain, and averaged 13.4 points and 4 assists per game as the Aggies ranked second in the Southwest Conference and finished with a 17–9 record.

Brown was a very fast player with a great crossover dribble.

Later years
Brown died of lung cancer one month after his diagnosis in 2002.  He was survived by his wife, Myrtle, and several children, including Nick Brown, a USA Junior National Champion in track and field who had much success in track and field at the University of Illinois, and Sergio Brown, a football safety who played in the NFL with four teams, including the New England Patriots.

References

2002 deaths
Texas A&M Aggies men's basketball players
Brown Mario
1951 births
American men's basketball players